Friedheim may refer to:

 Arthur Friedheim (1859–1932), Russia-born composer
 Friedheim Award, an annual award given for instrumental music composition
 Friedheim, Missouri, U.S.
 Friedheim International Ltd., British supplier of finishing, converting and packaging machinery
 The German name of Miasteczko Krajeńskie, a village in Greater Poland Voivodeship, Poland